Strip Tease is the 2004 album by Lady Saw. It was released August 24, 2004 under VP label. It features tracks produced by Sly Dunbar and Mad House Producer Dave Kelly.

Track listing

Charts

Notes

Lady Saw albums
2004 albums